Al Zahiyah is the former Tourist Club Area in Abu Dhabi, United Arab Emirates.

Al Zahiyah is an entertainment location, with restaurants, hotels (including the Beach Rotana), bars and nightlife. The Abu Dhabi Mall is also located here. Five bridges connect the area of Al Maryah Island, a business district. The area became known as the "Tourist Club Area" in the 1970s.

A major 258-million AED infrastructure project of new roads, bridges, etc., was completed in 2019.

References

External links
 

Neighborhoods of Abu Dhabi
Tourist attractions in Abu Dhabi